Tamora may refer to:

Tamora, Nebraska, a village in the United States
TVR Tamora, a British sports car
 Tamora Pierce (born 1954), American writer
Tamora, a character in William Shakespeare's play Titus Andronicus